This event was held on Saturday 28 January 2012 as part of the 2012 UCI Cyclo-cross World Championships. Seven laps had to be completed, totalling up to 20.65 kilometre.

Ranking

External links
 
 

Men's under-23 race
UCI Cyclo-cross World Championships – Men's under-23 race